"Feel It in My Bones" is a song recorded by Dutch DJ and record producer Tiësto, featuring Canadian band Tegan and Sara. It was released as the third single from Tiësto's fourth studio album, Kaleidoscope, on 7 September 2009. It was given a full single release on 4 June 2010.

The song came about after the twins received a number of tracks from Tiësto and they "honed in on something that we liked".

They have called it their first true collaboration, with Tegan saying that "it was a true collaboration; there's like two sections that Sara wrote, and three that I wrote."

The music video for "Feel It in My Bones" premiered on Tiësto's official YouTube channel on 13 January 2010.

Track listing
 Digital download (1)
 "Feel It in My Bones" – 4:52
 Digital download (2)
 "Feel It in My Bones"  – 3:25
 "Feel It in My Bones"  – 7:05
 "Feel It in My Bones"  – 8:07
 "Feel It in My Bones"  – 8:20
 "Feel It in My Bones"  – 4:52

Charts

Weekly charts

Year-end charts

Certifications

References

External links
 

2010 singles
2009 songs
Tiësto songs
Tegan and Sara songs
Songs written by Tiësto
Song recordings produced by Danja (record producer)